Polyodontes maxillosus is a species of polychaete worm in the family Acoetidae.

References 

 World Register of Marine Species

Polychaetes
Animals described in 1817